Live in Lisbon is a concert video release by Bryan Adams. It was released in North America only as a limited edition 3rd bonus disc to the 2005 compilation Anthology, was released in the UK as a stand-alone DVD. The stand-alone DVD features extra content such as one extra track When You're Gone sung with a member of the audience, a picture gallery, a radio interview and 3 music videos.

Track listing

Certifications

References

Live video albums
Bryan Adams albums
2005 video albums